MTV Unplugged: Música de fondo (Spanish: MTV Unplugged: Background Music) is the second live album recorded by Mexican alternative rock band Zoé. It was released on March 22, 2011, and it debuted at number one on the Mexican albums chart. The album features a selection of their greatest hits from their previous records as well as a new song, "Labios Rotos". Música de fondo was awarded the Latin Grammy award for "Best Alternative Music Album" on November 10, 2011.

The band is joined by Denise Gutierrez (“Lo Blondo”), vocalist of the Mexican alternative group Hello Seahorse!, who sings harmony and duets with León Larreguí on several songs and then sings the lead vocals on “Luna” late in the set. Mexican rock musician Chetes also accompanies the band on guitar and keyboard on various songs. Two additional celebrity guest performers sing duets with Larreguí during the set: Adrián Dargelos of the Argentine band Babasónicos, who sings on “Dead”, and Spanish rock singer Enrique Bunbury (former lead singer of Héroes del Silencio), who sings on “Nada”.

CD and DVD track listing  
All tracks written by Zoé

Special Edition

DVD

Chart and Certifications 
The album debuted at number one on the Mexican album charts for the week ending on March 27, 2011 replacing Viva el príncipe by Cristian Castro. The following week was replaced by Gloria Trevi's new album Gloria  but it went back again to number one for another week and was replaced by Britney Spears's Femme Fatale and went back to number one the following week where it stayed for three weeks in a row . The album was also certified diamond, double platinum and gold for selling over 450,000 copies in Mexico. On March 19, 2020 the album was re-released in a limited edition for the 10th anniversary and four weeks later on April 16 return to number one on the Mexican albums chart.

Certifications

Awards 
At the 2011 Latin Grammy Awards in Las Vegas Música de fondo won Best Alternative Music Album and "Labios rotos" won Best Rock Song.

References 

Mtv Unplugged Musica De Fondo
Zoé live albums
2011 live albums
Latin Grammy Award for Best Alternative Music Album